Just Marketing, Inc. (JMI), founded in 1995, is a motorsports marketing agency, sponsorship and advertising in Formula One, NASCAR Sprint Cup Series, NASCAR Xfinity Series, IndyCar Series, MotoGP and the WRC, among others.

History
JMI was founded in 1995 by CEO Zak Brown, a former racing driver.  In 2005 JMI brokered a deal between Crown Royal whisky and NASCAR, the first spirit to be a sponsor of the sport in over 40 years. NASCAR had previously banned sponsorship by spirits companies. In 2008 JMI brought LG into Formula 1, followed by UBS in 2010. In 2005 JMI moved its headquarters to Indianapolis, and expanded to the UK in 2005, and Hong Kong in 2010. In 2009 the JMI offices in the UK moved from Silverstone to Duke of York Square in London.

In October 2013, Chime Communications Limited acquired JMI for $76M. The acquisition was largely strategic in nature. Through the acquisition, Chime gained greater depth in its sports marketing presence and JMI gained access to Chime Communication's global advertising reach. Mr. Brown remained the Chief Executive Officer for JMI and also assumed the role of head of new business development for Chime Sports Marketing.

References

Notes

External links
 

Marketing companies of the United States
Auto racing mass media
Marketing companies established in 1995
Companies based in Indiana